Erik Galas (born July 16, 1986) is a former professional Canadian football slotback. He was signed as an undrafted free agent by the Montreal Alouettes in 2009. He played CIS football for the McGill Redmen. Galas is the all-time leader for catches in a CIS career. He was a Second-Team All-Canadian in 2007 and a First-Team All-Canadian in 2008.

He also played for the Mönchengladbach Mavericks of Mönchengladbach, Germany.

External links 
Montreal Alouettes bio

1986 births
Living people
Canadian football people from Ottawa
Players of Canadian football from Ontario
Canadian football slotbacks
McGill Redbirds football players
Montreal Alouettes players